Victoria Swarovski (born 16 August 1993) is an Austrian pop singer, television presenter, and businesswoman. She is an heiress to the multi-billion dollar Swarovski crystal empire.

Biography
Swarovski is the daughter of Alexandra and Paul Swarovski. Her mother worked as a journalist, and her father is present in the family-owned company Swarovski.

Since her childhood, she sang in several choirs. In 2009, she appeared with the song "Get gone" in a TV-show of Mario Barth. At 17, she signed a record deal with Sony Music. In November 2010, there appeared there her debut single "One in a million". She sang the theme song "There's a Place for us" in the film The Chronicles of Narnia: The Voyage of the Dawn Treader.

While Swarovski appeared under the name Victoria S. in the early years of her career, she now uses her real name. In 2014, she released the song "Beautiful" together with rapper Prince Kay One. In 2016, she won the ninth season of the RTL dance show Let's Dance; her dance-partner was Erich Klann. In September 2016, she sat next to Dieter Bohlen and Bruce Darnell in the jury of the RTL casting show Das Supertalent.

Since the end of 2010, Swarovski has been in a relationship with real-estate-investor Werner Mürz. The couple married on 20 May 2017.

In 2018, Swarovski replaced Sylvie Meis as the co-host in the eleventh season of Let's Dance. 

In 2021, Swarovski founded the beauty brand Orimei Beauty.

References

External links

1993 births
Living people
Austrian billionaires
21st-century Austrian women singers
Dancing with the Stars winners
Musicians from Innsbruck
RTL Group people